Founded in 2012, RDFZ United serves as the top-level administrative body to facilitate all the branches under its governance.

Branches and subsidiaries 
The most famous branch under its governance is High School Affiliated to Renmin University of China.

References

High schools in Beijing